Panos Mourdoukoutas (born October 11, 1955) is an American economist and Professor and Chair of the Department of Economics at LIU Post in New York. He also is a professor at Columbia University where he teaches graduate courses in security analysis and global emerging markets.

Controversial article
In July 2018, Forbes published an opinion piece by Mourdoukoutas titled "Amazon Should Replace Local Libraries to Save Taxpayers Money". It was deleted due to backlash from American libraries and their communities.

Books
 Collective Entrepreneurship
 The Ten Golden Rules, WOM and Buzz Marketing
 Business Strategy in a Semiglobal Economy
 China’s Challenge: Imitation or Innovation in International Business
 New Emerging Japanese Economy: Opportunity and Strategy for World Business

References

External links
Panos Mourdoukoutas

American economists
Living people
1955 births
American people of Greek descent
Stony Brook University alumni
Florida Atlantic University alumni
Aristotle University of Thessaloniki alumni